Talanga sexpunctalis is a moth of the family Crambidae described by Frederic Moore in 1887. It is found in South-east Asia, including Kolkata, Hong Kong, New Guinea, Thailand and Queensland in Australia.

Adults are yellow with a prominent brown triangle on each forewing costa, a pair of black spots near each hindwing tornus, and a number of transparent windows. The wings have an iridescent sheen.

External links

Moths described in 1887
Spilomelinae